The American black bear (Ursus americanus), also known as the black bear or sometimes baribal, is a species of medium-sized bear endemic to North America. It is the continent's smallest and most widely distributed bear species. The American black bear is an omnivore, with its diet varying greatly depending on season and location. It typically lives in largely forested areas, but will leave forests in search of food, and is sometimes attracted to human communities due to the immediate availability of food.

The International Union for Conservation of Nature (IUCN) lists the American black bear as a least-concern species, due to its widespread distribution and a large population estimated to be twice that of all other bear species combined. Along with the brown bear (Ursus arctos), it is one of only two modern bear species not considered by the IUCN to be globally threatened with extinction.

Taxonomy and evolution 

Despite living in North America, American black bears are not closely related to brown bears and polar bears; genetic studies reveal that they split from a common ancestor 5.05 million years ago (mya). American and Asian black bears are considered sister taxa and are more closely related to each other than to the other modern species of bears. According to recent studies, the sun bear is also a relatively recent split from this lineage.

A small primitive bear called Ursus abstrusus is the oldest known North American fossil member of the genus Ursus, dated to 4.95 mya. This suggests that U. abstrusus may be the direct ancestor of the American black bear, which evolved in North America. Although Wolverton and Lyman still consider U. vitabilis an "apparent precursor to modern black bears", it has also been placed within U. americanus.

The ancestors of American black bears and Asian black bears diverged from sun bears 4.58 mya. The American black bear then split from the Asian black bear 4.08 mya. The earliest American black bear fossils, which were located in Port Kennedy, Pennsylvania, greatly resemble the Asian species, though later specimens grew to sizes comparable to grizzly bears. From the Holocene to the present, American black bears seem to have shrunk in size, but this has been disputed because of problems with dating these fossil specimens.

The American black bear lived during the same period as the giant and lesser short-faced bears (Arctodus simus and A. pristinus, respectively) and the Florida spectacled bear (Tremarctos floridanus). These tremarctine bears evolved from bears that had emigrated from Asia to the Americas 7–8 mya. The giant and lesser short-faced bears are thought to have been heavily carnivorous and the Florida spectacled bear more herbivorous, while the American black bears remained arboreal omnivores, like their Asian ancestors. The American black bear's generalist behavior allowed it to exploit a wider variety of foods and has been given as a reason why, of these three genera, it alone survived climate and vegetative changes through the last Ice Age while the other, more specialized North American predators became extinct. However, both Arctodus and Tremarctos had survived several other, previous ice ages. After these prehistoric ursids became extinct during the last glacial period 10,000 years ago, American black bears were probably the only bear present in much of North America until the migration of brown bears to the rest of the continent.

Hybrids 

American black bears are reproductively compatible with several other bear species and occasionally produce hybrid offspring. According to Jack Hanna's Monkeys on the Interstate, a bear captured in Sanford, Florida was thought to have been the offspring of an escaped female Asian black bear and a male American black bear. In 1859, an American black bear and a Eurasian brown bear were bred together in the London Zoological Gardens, but the three cubs that were born, died before they reached maturity. In The Variation of Animals and Plants Under Domestication, Charles Darwin noted:

A bear shot in autumn 1986 in Michigan was thought by some to be an American black bear/grizzly bear hybrid, due to its unusually large size and its proportionately larger brain case and skull. DNA testing was unable to determine whether it was a large American black bear or a grizzly bear.

Subspecies 
Sixteen subspecies are traditionally recognized; however, a recent genetic study does not support designating some of these, such as the Florida black bear, as distinct subspecies. Listed alphabetically according to subspecific name:

Distribution and population 

Historically, American black bears occupied the majority of North America's forested regions. Today, they are primarily limited to sparsely settled, forested areas. American black bears currently inhabit much of their original Canadian range, though they seldom occur in the southern farmlands of Alberta, Saskatchewan and Manitoba; they have been extirpated on Prince Edward Island since 1937. The total Canadian black bear population is between 396,000 and 476,000, based on surveys taken in the mid-1990s in seven Canadian provinces, though this estimate excludes American black bear populations in New Brunswick, the Northwest Territories, Nova Scotia and Saskatchewan. All provinces indicated stable populations of American black bears over the last decade.

The current range of American black bears in the United States is constant throughout most of the Northeast and within the Appalachian Mountains almost continuously from Maine to northern Georgia, the northern Midwest, the Rocky Mountain region, the West Coast and Alaska. However, it becomes increasingly fragmented or absent in other regions. Despite this, American black bears in those areas seem to have expanded their range during the last decade, such as with recent sightings in Ohio, Illinois, and southern Indiana. Sightings of itinerant American black bears in the Driftless Area of southeastern Minnesota, northeastern Iowa, and southwestern Wisconsin are common. In the spring of 2019, biologists with the Iowa Department of Natural Resources confirmed documentation of an American black bear living year-round in woodlands near the town of Decorah in northeastern Iowa, believed to be the first instance of a resident black bear in Iowa since the 1880s.

Surveys taken from 35 states in the early 1990s indicate that American black bears are either stable or increasing, except in Idaho and New Mexico. The overall population of American black bears in the United States has been estimated to range between 339,000 and 465,000, though this excludes populations from Alaska, Idaho, South Dakota, Texas and Wyoming, whose population sizes are unknown. In the state of California, there are an estimated 25,000-35,000 American black bears, making it the largest population of the species in the contiguous United States.

As of 1993, known Mexican black bear populations existed in four areas, though knowledge on the distribution of populations outside those areas has not been updated since 1959. Mexico is the only country where the American black bear is classified as "endangered".

There have been several sightings quite far away from where the American black bear is normally found, such as western Nebraska.

There are about 1,500 bears in Great Smoky Mountains National Park. The population density is about two per square mile. They inhabit all elevations in the park.

Habitat 
Throughout their range, habitats preferred by American black bears have a few shared characteristics. They are often found in areas with relatively inaccessible terrain, thick understory vegetation and large quantities of edible material (especially masts). The adaptation to woodlands and thick vegetation in this species may have originally been due to the American black bear having evolved alongside larger, more aggressive bear species, such as the extinct giant short-faced bear and the still-living grizzly bear, that monopolized more open habitats and the historic presence of larger predators, such as Smilodon and the American lion, that could have preyed on American black bears. Although found in the largest numbers in wild, undisturbed areas and rural regions, American black bears can adapt to surviving in some numbers in peri-urban regions, as long as they contain easily accessible foods and some vegetative coverage.

For American black bears living in the American Southwest and Mexico, habitat usually consists of stands of chaparral and pinyon juniper woods. In this region, bears occasionally move to more open areas to feed on prickly pear cactus. At least two distinct, prime habitat types are inhabited in the Southeastern United States. American black bears in the southern Appalachian Mountains survive in predominantly oak-hickory and mixed mesophytic forests. In the coastal areas of the Southeast (such as Florida, the Carolinas and Louisiana), bears inhabit a mixture of flatwoods, bays and swampy hardwood sites.

In the northeastern part of the range (the United States and Canada), prime habitat consists of a forest canopy of hardwoods such as beech, maple, birch and coniferous species. Corn crops and oak-hickory mast are also common sources of food in some sections of the Northeast; small, thick swampy areas provide excellent refuge cover largely in stands of white cedar. Along the Pacific coast, redwood, Sitka spruce and hemlocks predominate as overstory cover. Within these northern forest types are early successional areas important for American black bears, such as fields of brush, wet and dry meadows, high tidelands, riparian areas and a variety of mast-producing hardwood species. The spruce-fir forest dominates much of the range of the American black bear in the Rockies. Important non-forested areas here are wet meadows, riparian areas, avalanche chutes, roadsides, burns, sidehill parks and subalpine ridgetops.

In areas where human development is relatively low, such as stretches of Canada and Alaska, American black bears tend to be found more regularly in lowland regions. In parts of northeastern Canada, especially Labrador, American black bears have adapted exclusively to semi-open areas that are more typical habitat in North America for brown bears (likely due to the absence there of brown and polar bears, as well as other large carnivore species).

Description

Build 

The skulls of American black bears are broad, with narrow muzzles and large jaw hinges. In Virginia, the total length of adult bear skulls was found to average . Females tend to have slenderer and more pointed faces than males. Their claws are typically black or grayish-brown. The claws are short and rounded, being thick at the base and tapering to a point. Claws from both hind and front legs are almost identical in length, though the foreclaws tend to be more sharply curved. The soles of the feet are black or brownish and are naked, leathery and deeply wrinkled. The hind legs are relatively longer than those of Asian black bears. The ears are small and rounded and are set well back on the head.

American black bears are highly dexterous, being capable of opening screw-top jars and manipulating door latches. They also have great physical strength; a bear weighing  was observed turning flat rocks weighing  by flipping them over with a single foreleg. American black bears have good eyesight and have been proven experimentally to be able to learn visual color discrimination tasks faster than chimpanzees and just as fast as domestic dogs. They are also capable of rapidly learning to distinguish different shapes such as small triangles, circles and squares.

Size 

American black bear weight tends to vary according to age, sex, health and season. Seasonal variation in weight is very pronounced: in autumn, their pre-den weight tends to be 30% higher than in spring, when black bears emerge from their dens. American black bears on the East Coast tend to be heavier on average than those on the West Coast, although American black bears follow Bergmann's rule and bears from the Northwest are often slightly heavier than the bears from the Southeast.

In Yellowstone National Park, a population study found that adult males averaged  and adult females averaged . In Waterton Lakes National Park, Alberta, adults reportedly averaged . Although they are the smallest bear species in North America, large males exceed the size of other bear species, except the brown bear and the polar bear.

The record-sized American black bear from New Jersey was shot in Morris County December 2011 and scaled . The North American Bear Center, located in Ely, Minnesota, is home to the world's largest captive male and female American black bears.

Pelage 

The fur is soft, with dense underfur and long, coarse, thick guard hairs. The fur is not as shaggy or coarse as that of brown bears. American black bear skins can be distinguished from those of Asian black bears by the lack of a white blaze on the chest and hairier footpads. Despite their name, American black bears show a great deal of color variation. Individual coat colors can range from white, blonde, cinnamon, light brown or dark chocolate brown to jet black, with many intermediate variations existing. Silvery-gray American black bears with a blue luster (this is found mostly on the flanks) occur along a portion of coastal Alaska and British Columbia. White to cream-colored American black bears occur in the coastal islands and the adjacent mainland of southwestern British Columbia. Albino individuals have also been recorded. Black coats tend to predominate in moist areas such as Maine, New York, Tennessee, Michigan and western Washington. Approximately 70% of all American black bears are black, though only 50% of American black bears in the Rocky Mountains are black. Many American black bears in northwestern North America are cinnamon, blonde or light brown in color and thus may sometimes be mistaken for grizzly bears. Grizzly (and other types of brown) bears can be distinguished by their shoulder hump, larger size and broader, more concave skull.

In his book The Great Bear Almanac, Gary Brown summarized the predominance of black or brown/blonde specimens by location:

Behavior and life history 

American black bears have eyesight and hearing comparable to that of humans. Their keenest sense is their sense of smell, which is about seven times more sensitive than a domestic dog's. American black bears are excellent and strong swimmers, swimming for pleasure and to feed (largely on fish). They regularly climb trees to feed, escape enemies and hibernate. Four of the eight modern bear species are habitually arboreal (the most arboreal species, the American and Asian black bears and the sun bear, being fairly closely related). Their arboreal abilities tend to decline with age. They may be active at any time of the day or night, although they mainly forage by night. American black bears living near human habitations tend to be more extensively nocturnal, while those living near brown bears tend to be more often diurnal.

American black bears tend to be territorial and non-gregarious in nature. However, at abundant food sources (e.g. spawning salmon or garbage dumps), they may congregate and dominance hierarchies form, with the largest, most powerful males dominating the most fruitful feeding spots. They mark their territories by rubbing their bodies against trees and clawing at the bark. Annual ranges held by mature male American black bears tend to be very large, though there is some variation.

American black bears may communicate with various vocal and non-vocal sounds. Tongue-clicking and grunting are the most common sounds and are made in cordial situations to conspecifics, offspring and occasionally humans. When at ease, they produce a loud rumbling hum. During times of fear or nervousness, bears may moan, huff or blow air. Warning sounds include jaw-clicking and lip-popping. In aggressive interactions, black bears produce guttural pulsing calls that may sound like growling. Cubs squeal, bawl or scream when anxious and make a motor-like humming sound when comfortable or nursing. American black bears often mark trees using their teeth and claws as a form of communication with other bears, a behavior common to many species of bears.

Reproduction and development 
Sows usually produce their first litter at the age of 3 to 5 years, with those living in more developed areas tending to get pregnant at younger ages. The breeding period usually occurs in the June–July period, though it can extend to August in the species' northern range. The breeding period lasts for two to three months. Both sexes are promiscuous. Males try to mate with several females, but large, dominant ones may violently claim a female if another mature male comes near. Copulation can last 20–30 minutes. Sows tend to be short-tempered with their mates after copulating. The fertilized eggs undergo delayed development and do not implant in the female's womb until November. The gestation period lasts 235 days and litters are usually born in late January to early February. Litter size is between one and six cubs, typically two or three. At birth, cubs weigh  and measure  in length. They are born with fine, gray, down-like hair and their hind quarters are underdeveloped. They typically open their eyes after 28–40 days and begin walking after 5 weeks. Cubs are dependent on their mother's milk for 30 weeks and will reach independence at 16–18 months. At the age of 6 weeks, they attain , by the age of 8 weeks they reach  and by the age of 6 months they weigh . They reach sexual maturity at the age of 3 years and attain their full growth at the age of 5 years.

Longevity and mortality 

The average lifespan in the wild is 18 years, though it is quite possible for wild individuals to survive for more than 23 years. The record age of a wild individual was 39 years, while that in captivity was 44 years. The average annual survival rate for adult American black bears is variable, ranging from 86% in Florida to 73% in Virginia and North Carolina. In Minnesota, 99% of wintering adult bears were able to survive the hibernation cycle in one study. Remarkably, a study of American black bears in Nevada found that the amount of annual mortality of a population of bears in wilderness areas was 0%, whereas in developed areas in the state this figure rose to 83%. Survival in subadults is generally less assured. In Alaska, only 14–17% of subadult males and 30–48% of subadult females were found in a study to survive to adulthood. Across the range, the estimated number of cubs who survive past their first year is 60%.

With the exception of the rare confrontation with an adult brown bear or a gray wolf pack, adult American black bears are not usually subject to natural predation. However, as evidenced by scats with fur inside of them and the recently discovered carcass of an adult sow with puncture marks in the skull, American black bears may occasionally fall prey to jaguars in the southern parts of their range. In such scenarios, the big cat would have the advantage if it ambushed the bear, killing it with a crushing bite to the back of the skull. American black bear cubs tend to be more vulnerable to predation than adults. Known predators of bear cubs have included bobcats, coyotes, cougars, gray wolves, brown bears and other bears of their own species. Many of these will stealthily snatch small cubs right from under the sleeping mother. There is a single record of a golden eagle snatching a yearling cub. Once out of hibernation, mother bears may be able to fight off most potential predators. Even cougars will be displaced by an angry mother bear if they are discovered stalking the cubs. Flooding of dens after birth may also occasionally kill newborn cubs. However, in current times, American black bear fatalities are mainly attributable to human activities. Seasonally, thousands of American black bears are hunted legally across North America to control their numbers, while some are illegally poached or trapped unregulated. Auto collisions also may claim many American black bear lives annually.

Hibernation 

American black bears were once not considered true or "deep" hibernators, but because of discoveries about the metabolic changes that allow American black bears to remain dormant for months without eating, drinking, urinating or defecating, most biologists have redefined mammalian hibernation as "specialized, seasonal reduction in metabolism concurrent with scarce food and cold weather". American black bears are now considered highly efficient hibernators. The physiology of American black bears in the wild is closely related to that of bears in captivity. Understanding the physiology of bears in the wild is vital to the bear's success in captivity.

The bears enter their dens in October and November, although in the southernmost areas of their range (i.e. Florida, Mexico, the Southeastern United States), only pregnant females and mothers with yearling cubs will enter hibernation. Hibernation in American black bears typically lasts 3–8 months, depending on regional climate.

Hibernating American black bears spend their time in hollowed-out dens in tree cavities, under logs or rocks, in banks, caves, or culverts and in shallow depressions. Although naturally made dens are occasionally used, most dens are dug out by the bear itself. Females have been shown to be pickier in their choice of dens in comparison to males.

During their time in hibernation, an American black bear's heart rate drops from 40 to 50 beats per minute to 8 beats per minute and the metabolic rate can drop to a quarter of the bear's (nonhibernating) basal metabolic rate (BMR). These reductions in metabolic rate and heart rate do not appear to decrease the bear's ability to heal injuries during hibernation. Their circadian rhythm stays intact during hibernation. This allows the bear to sense the changes in the day based on the ambient temperature caused by the sun's position in the sky. It has also been shown that ambient light exposure and low disturbance levels (that is to say, wild bears in ambient light conditions) directly correlate with their activity levels. The bear keeping track of the changing days allows it to awaken from hibernation at the appropriate time of year to conserve as much energy as possible.

The hibernating American black bear does not display the same rate of muscle and bone atrophy relative to other nonhibernatory animals that are subject to long periods of inactivity due to ailment or old age. A hibernating American black bear loses approximately half the muscular strength compared to that of a well-nourished, inactive human. The bear's bone mass does not change in geometry or mineral composition during hibernation, which implies that the bear's conservation of bone mass during hibernation is due to a biological mechanism. During hibernation American black bears retain all excretory waste, leading to the development of a hardened mass of fecal material in the colon known as a fecal plug. A special hormone, leptin, is released into the bear's systems to suppress appetite. The retention of waste during hibernation (specifically in minerals such as calcium) may play a role in the bear's resistance to atrophy.
 
The body temperature of the American black bear does not drop significantly, like other mammalian hibernators (staying around ) and they remain somewhat alert and active. If the winter is mild enough, they may wake up and forage for food. Females also give birth in February and nurture their cubs until the snow melts. During winter, American black bears consume 25–40% of their body weight. The footpads peel off while they sleep, making room for new tissue.

Many of the physiological changes an American black bear exhibits during hibernation are retained slightly post-hibernation. Upon exiting hibernation, bears retain a reduced heart rate and basal metabolic rate. The metabolic rate of a hibernating bear will remain at a reduced level for up to 21 days after hibernation. After emerging from their winter dens in spring, they wander their home ranges for two weeks so that their metabolism accustoms itself to the activity. In mountainous areas, they seek southerly slopes at lower elevations for forage and move to northerly and easterly slopes at higher elevations as summer progresses.

The time that American black bears emerge from hibernation varies.  Factors affecting this include temperature, flooding, and hunger.  In southern areas, they may wake up in midwinter.  Further north, they may not be seen until late March, April, or even early May.  Altitude also has an effect.  Bears at lower altitudes tend to emerge earlier.  Finally, mature males tend to come out earliest, followed by immature males and females, and lastly mothers with cubs.  Mothers with yearling cubs are seen before those with newborns.

Dietary habits 

Generally, American black bears are largely crepuscular in foraging activity, though they may actively feed at any time. Up to 85% of the American black bear's diet consists of vegetation, though they tend to dig less than brown bears, eating far fewer roots, bulbs, corms and tubers than the latter species. When initially emerging from hibernation, they will seek to feed on carrion from winter-killed animals and newborn ungulates. As the spring temperature warms, American black bears seek new shoots of many plant species, especially new grasses, wetland plants and forbs. Young shoots and buds from trees and shrubs during the spring period are also especially important to American black bears emerging from hibernation, as they assist in rebuilding muscle and strengthening the skeleton and are often the only digestible foods available at that time. During summer, the diet largely comprises fruits, especially berries and soft masts such as buds and drupes. During the autumn hyperphagia, feeding becomes virtually the full-time task of American black bears. Hard masts become the most important part of the American black bear's diet in autumn and may even partially dictate the species' distribution. Favored masts such as hazelnuts, oak acorns and whitebark pine nuts may be consumed by the hundreds each day by a single American black bear during the fall. During the fall period, American black bears may also habitually raid the nut caches of tree squirrels. Also extremely important in fall are berries such as huckleberries and buffalo berries. American black bears living in areas near human settlements or around a considerable influx of recreational human activity often come to rely on foods inadvertently provided by humans, especially during summertime. These include refuse, birdseed, agricultural products and honey from apiaries.

The majority of the American black bear's animal diet consists of insects, such as bees, yellow jackets, ants and their larvae. American black bears are also fond of honey and will gnaw through trees if hives are too deeply set into the trunks for them to reach it with their paws. Once the hive is breached, the bears will scrape the honeycombs together with their paws and eat them, regardless of stings from the bees. American black bears that live in northern coastal regions (especially the Pacific Coast) will fish for salmon during the night, as their black fur is easily spotted by salmon in the daytime. Other bears, such as the white-furred Kermode bears of the islands of western Canada, have a 30% greater success rate in catching salmon than their black-furred counterparts. Other fish, including suckers, trout and catfish, are readily caught whenever possible. Although American black bears do not often engage in active predation of other large animals for much of the year, the species will regularly prey on mule and white-tailed deer fawns in spring, given the opportunity. Bears may catch the scent of hiding fawns when foraging for something else and then sniff them out and pounce on them. As the fawns reach 10 days of age, they can outmaneuver the bears and their scent is soon ignored until the next year. American black bears have also been recorded similarly preying on elk calves in Idaho and moose calves in Alaska.

Predation on adult deer is rare, but it has been recorded. They may even hunt prey up to the size of adult female moose, which are considerably larger than themselves, by ambushing them. There is at least one record of a male American black bear killing two bull elk over the course of six days by chasing them into deep snow banks, which impeded their movements. In Labrador, American black bears are exceptionally carnivorous, living largely off caribou, usually young, injured, old, sickly or dead specimens, and rodents such as voles. This is believed to be due to a paucity of edible plant life in this sub-Arctic region and a local lack of competing large carnivores (including other bear species). Like brown bears, American black bears try to use surprise to ambush their prey and target the weak, injured, sickly or dying animals in the herds. Once a deer fawn is captured, it is frequently torn apart alive while feeding. If it is able to capture a mother deer in spring, the bear frequently begins feeding on the udder of lactating females, but generally prefers meat from the viscera. American black bears often drag their prey to cover, preferring to feed in seclusion. The skin of large prey is stripped back and turned inside out, with the skeleton usually left largely intact. Unlike gray wolves and coyotes, American black bears rarely scatter the remains of their kills. Vegetation around the carcass is usually matted down by American black bears and their droppings are frequently found nearby. American black bears may attempt to cover remains of larger carcasses, though they do not do so with the same frequency as cougars and grizzly bears. They will readily consume eggs and nestlings of various birds and can easily access many tree nests, even the huge nests of bald eagles. American black bears have been reported stealing deer and other game from human hunters.

Interspecific predatory relationships 
Over much of their range, American black bears are assured scavengers that can intimidate, using their large size and considerable strength, and if necessary dominate other predators in confrontations over carcasses. However, on occasions where they encounter Kodiak or grizzly bears, the larger two brown subspecies dominate them. American black bears tend to escape competition from brown bears by being more active in the daytime and living in more densely forested areas. Violent interactions, resulting in the deaths of American black bears, have been recorded in Yellowstone National Park.

American black bears do occasionally compete with cougars over carcasses. Like brown bears, they will sometimes steal kills from cougars. One study found that both bear species visited 24% of cougar kills in Yellowstone and Glacier National Parks, usurping 10% of the carcasses. Another study found that American black bears visited 48% of cougar kills in summer in Colorado and 77% of kills in California. As a result, the cats spend more time killing and less time feeding on each kill.

American black bear interactions with gray wolves are much rarer than with brown bears, due to differences in habitat preferences. The majority of American black bear encounters with wolves occur in the species' northern range, with no interactions being recorded in Mexico. Despite the American black bear being more powerful on a one-to-one basis, packs of wolves have been recorded to kill black bears on numerous occasions without eating them. Unlike brown bears, American black bears frequently lose against wolves in disputes over kills. Wolf packs typically kill American black bears when the larger animals are in their hibernation cycle.

There is at least one record of an American black bear killing a wolverine (Gulo gulo) in a dispute over food in Yellowstone National Park. Anecdotal cases of alligator predation on American black bears have been reported, though such cases may involve assaults on cubs.

At least one jaguar (Panthera onca) has been recorded to have attacked and eaten a black bear: "El Jefe", the jaguar famous for being the first jaguar seen in the United States in over a century.

Relationships with humans

In folklore, mythology and culture

Indigenous 
American black bears feature prominently in the stories of some of America's indigenous peoples. One tale tells of how the black bear was a creation of the Great Spirit, while the grizzly bear was created by the Evil Spirit. In the mythology of the Haida, Tlingit and Tsimshian people of the Northwest Coast, mankind first learned to respect bears when a girl married the son of a black bear chieftain. In Kwakwa̱ka̱ʼwakw mythology, American black and brown bears became enemies when Grizzly Bear Woman killed Black Bear Woman for being lazy. Black Bear Woman's children, in turn, killed Grizzly Bear Woman's children. The Navajo believed that the Big Black Bear was chief among the bears of the four directions surrounding Sun's house and would pray to it in order to be granted its protection during raids.

Sleeping Bear Dunes in Michigan is named after a Native American legend, where a female bear and her two cubs swam across Lake Michigan to escape a fire on the Wisconsin shore. The mother bear reached the shore and waited for her cubs, but they did not make it across. Two islands mark where the cubs drowned, while the dune marks the spot where the mother bear waited.

Anglo-American 
Morris Michtom, the creator of the teddy bear, was inspired to make the toy when he came across a cartoon of Theodore Roosevelt refusing to shoot an American black bear cub tied to a tree. The fictional character Winnie-the-Pooh was named after Winnipeg, a female American black bear cub that lived at the London Zoo from 1915 until her death in 1934. An American black bear cub, who in the spring of 1950 was caught in the Capitan Gap Fire, was made into the living representative of Smokey Bear, the mascot of the United States Forest Service.

Terrible Ted was a de-toothed and de-clawed American black bear who was forced to perform as a pro wrestler and whose "career" lasted from the 1950s to the 1970s. The American black bear is the mascot of the University of Maine and Baylor University, where the university houses two live American black bears on campus.

Attacks on humans 

Although an adult bear is quite capable of killing a human, American black bears typically avoid confronting humans. Unlike grizzly bears, which became a subject of fearsome legend among the European settlers of North America, black bears were rarely considered overly dangerous, even though they lived in areas where the pioneers had settled.

American black bears rarely attack when confronted by humans and usually only make mock charges, emit blowing noises and swat the ground with their forepaws. The number of attacks on humans is higher than those by brown bears in North America, but this is largely because black bears considerably outnumber brown bears. Compared to brown bear attacks, aggressive encounters with American black bears rarely lead to serious injury. Most American black bear attacks tend to be motivated by hunger rather than territoriality and thus victims have a higher probability of surviving by fighting back rather than submitting. Unlike female brown bears, female American black bears are not as protective of their cubs and rarely attack humans in the vicinity of the cubs. However, occasionally such attacks do occur. The worst recorded attack occurred in May 1978, in which an American black bear killed three teenagers fishing in Algonquin Park in Ontario. Another exceptional attack occurred in August 1997 in Liard River Hot Springs Provincial Park in British Columbia, when an emaciated American black bear attacked a mother and child, killing the mother and a man who intervened. The bear was shot while mauling a fourth victim.

The majority of attacks happened in national parks, usually near campgrounds, where the bears had habituated to close human proximity and food. Of 1,028 incidents of aggressive acts toward humans, recorded from 1964 to 1976 in the Great Smoky Mountains National Park, 107 resulted in injury and occurred mainly in tourist hot spots where people regularly fed the bears handouts. In almost every case where open garbage dumps that attracted American black bears were closed and handouts ceased, the number of aggressive encounters dropped. However, in the Liard River Hot Springs case, the bear was apparently almost fully dependent on a local garbage dump that had closed and so was starving to death. Attempts to relocate American black bears are typically unsuccessful, as the bears seem able to return to their home range, even without familiar landscape cues.

Livestock and crop predation 
A limitation of food sources in early spring and wild berry and nut crop failures in summer may contribute to American black bears regularly feeding from human-based food sources. These bears often eat crops, especially during autumn hyperphagia when natural foods are scarce. Favored crops include apples, oats and corn. American black bears can do extensive damage in areas of the northwestern United States by stripping the bark from trees and feeding on the cambium. Livestock depredations occur mostly in spring. Although they occasionally hunt adult cattle and horses, they seem to prefer smaller prey such as sheep, goats, pigs and young calves. They usually kill by biting the neck and shoulders, though they may break the neck or back of the prey with blows with the paws. Evidence of a bear attack includes claw marks and is often found on the neck, back and shoulders of larger animals. Surplus killing of sheep and goats are common. American black bears have been known to frighten livestock herds over cliffs, causing injuries and death to many animals; whether or not this is intentional is not known. Occasionally American black bears kill pets, especially domestic dogs, which are most prone to harass a bear. It is not recommended to use unleashed dogs to deter bear attacks. Although large, aggressive dogs can sometimes cause a bear to run, if pressed, angry bears often turn the tables and end up chasing the dogs in return. A bear in pursuit of a pet dog can threaten both canid and human lives.

In British Columbia, a group of American black bears were used as guard animals to protect a marijuana plantation.

Hunting

Hunting 

The hunting of American black bears has taken place since the initial settlement of the Americas. The first piece of evidence dates to a Clovis site at Lehner Ranch, Arizona. Partially calcined teeth of a 3-month old black bear cub came from a roasting pit, suggesting the bear cub was eaten. The surrounding charcoal was dated to the Early Holocene (10,940 BP). Black bear remains also appear to be associated with early peoples in Tlapacoya, Mexico. Native Americans increasingly utilized black bears during the Holocene, particularly in the late Holocene upper Midwest, e.g., Hopewell and Mississippian cultures.

Some Native American tribes, in admiration for the American black bear's intelligence, would decorate the heads of bears they killed with trinkets and place them on blankets. Tobacco smoke would be wafted into the disembodied head's nostrils by the hunter that dealt the killing blow, who would compliment the animal for its courage. The Kutchin typically hunted American black bears during their hibernation cycle. Unlike the hunting of hibernating grizzly bears, which was fraught with danger, hibernating American black bears took longer to awaken and hunting them was thus safer and easier. During the European colonisation of eastern North America, thousands of American black bears were hunted for their meat, fat and fur. Theodore Roosevelt wrote extensively on American black bear hunting in his Hunting the Grisly and other sketches, in which he stated,

He wrote that American black bears were difficult to hunt by stalking, due to their habitat preferences, though they were easy to trap. Roosevelt described how, in the southern states, planters regularly hunted American black bears on horseback with hounds. General Wade Hampton was known to have been present at 500 successful American black bear hunts, two-thirds of which he killed personally. He killed 30 or 40 American black bears with only a knife, which he would use to stab the bears between the shoulder blades while they were distracted by his hounds. Unless well trained, horses were often useless in American black bear hunts, as they often bolted when the bears stood their ground. In 1799, 192,000 American black bear skins were exported from Quebec. In 1822, 3,000 skins were exported from the Hudson's Bay Company. In 1992, untanned, fleshed and salted American black bear hides were sold for an average of $165.

In Canada, American black bears are considered as both a big game and furbearer species in all provinces, save for New Brunswick and the Northwest Territories, where they are only classed as a big game species. There are around 80,900 licensed American black bear hunters in all of Canada. Canadian black bear hunts take place in the fall and spring and both male and female bears can be legally taken, though some provinces prohibit the hunting of females with cubs, or yearlings.

Currently, 28 of the U.S. states have American black bear hunting seasons. Nineteen states require a bear hunting license, with some also requiring a big game license. In eight states, only a big game license is required to hunt American black bears. Overall, over 481,500 American black bear hunting licenses are sold per year. The hunting methods and seasons vary greatly according to state, with some bear hunting seasons including fall only, spring and fall, or year-round. New Jersey, in November 2010, approved a six-day bear-hunting season in early December 2010 to slow the growth of the American black bear population. Bear hunting had been banned in New Jersey for five years before that time. A Fairleigh Dickinson University PublicMind poll found that 53% of New Jersey voters approved of the new season if scientists concluded that American black bears were leaving their usual habitats and destroying private property. Men, older voters and those living in rural areas were more likely to approve of a bear hunting season in New Jersey than women, younger voters and those living in more developed parts of the state. In the western states, where there are large American black bear populations, there are spring and year-round seasons. Approximately 18,000 American black bears were killed annually in the U.S. between 1988 and 1992. Within this period, annual kills ranged from six bears in South Carolina to 2,232 in Maine.

According to Dwight Schuh in his Bowhunter's Encyclopedia, American black bears are the third most popular quarry of bowhunters, behind deer and elk.

Meat 
American black bear meat had historically been held in high esteem among North America's indigenous people and colonists. American black bears were the only bear species the Kutchin hunted for their meat, though this constituted only a small part of their diet. According to the second volume of Frank Forester's Field Sports of the United States, and British Provinces, of North America:

Theodore Roosevelt himself likened the flesh of young American black bears to that of pork, and not as coarse or flavorless as the meat of grizzly bears. The most favored cuts of the American black bear's meat are concentrated in the legs and loins. Meat from the neck, front legs and shoulders is usually ground into minced meat or used for stews and casseroles. Keeping the fat on tends to give the meat a strong flavor. As American black bears can have trichinellosis, cooking temperatures need to be high in order to kill the parasites.

American black bear fat was once valued as a cosmetic article that promoted hair growth and gloss. The fat most favored for this purpose was the hard white fat found in the body's interior. As only a small portion of this fat could be harvested for this purpose, the oil was often mixed with large quantities of hog lard. However, animal rights activism over the last decade has slowed the harvest of these animals; therefore the lard from American black bears has not been used in recent years for the purpose of cosmetics.

See also 
 List of fatal bear attacks in North America

References

Further reading

External links 

 
 Wildlifeinformation.org: American Black Bear Conservation Action Plan

American black bears
Articles containing video clips
Extant Piacenzian first appearances
Bear, American black
Mammals described in 1780
Bear, American black
Pleistocene mammals of North America
Pliocene carnivorans
Pliocene mammals of North America
Quaternary carnivorans
Quaternary mammals of North America
Scavengers
Symbols of Alabama
Symbols of West Virginia
Taxa named by Peter Simon Pallas